"I'm So Sorry" is a song by American rock band Imagine Dragons. The song serves as the second promotional single and fourth track from the band's second studio album Smoke + Mirrors. Along with the songs "Hopeless Opus" and "Gold" on Smoke + Mirrors, the song touches upon lead-singer Dan Reynolds' depression struggles. The song has peaked at number 14 on the Billboard Hot Rock Songs chart.

Critical reception
The song has been compared to the work of the Black Keys by music critics, with Mikael Wood of the Los Angeles Times comparing the song to the Black Keys' "fuzzy garage blues" sound, Jon Dolan of Rolling Stone describing the song as a "Black Keys-indebted garage-blues grinder", and Stephen Thomas Erlewine of AllMusic calling the song "a Black Keys number stripped of any sense of R&B groove".

Track listing

Chart performance

Peak positions

Year-end charts

Certifications

References

2014 songs
Imagine Dragons songs
Interscope Records singles
Songs written by Wayne Sermon
Songs written by Dan Reynolds (musician)
Songs written by Daniel Platzman
Songs written by Ben McKee